Minaya is a municipality in Albacete, Castile-La Mancha, Spain.

Minaya may also refer to:

Isairis Minaya, (born 1992), Dominican football manager, former footballer
Joiri Minaya, (born 1990), American multidisciplinary artist
Juan Minaya, (born 1991), Dominican professional baseball player
Juan Minaya Molano, (born 1941), Colombian chess player
Leo Minaya, American film actor
Leo Perez Minaya, American businessman and engineer
Leopoldo Minaya, (born 1963), Dominican-American poet
Omar Minaya, (born 1958), Dominican baseball executive and general manager of the New York Mets

Spanish-language surnames